Juniperus blancoi is a species of conifer in the family Cupressaceae. It is endemic to Mexico.

References

blancoi
Endemic flora of Mexico
Flora of Central Mexico
Trees of Durango
Taxonomy articles created by Polbot
Plants described in 1946